Simon Nadin (born 10 July 1965) is a British rock climber and professional photographer, who won the first ever IFSC Climbing World Cup in 1989.

Climbing
Nadin was a climbing all-rounder and pioneered routes which set new levels in climbing. He started climbing on gritstone outcrops, such as The Roaches, near his home in Buxton and using nuts made in his school metalwork lessons.

Within a year of starting climbing he was climbing at E6 level and in later years frequently onsight-soloed E4, E5 or harder routes.

In 1989, having only been a professional climber for six months, he became the first IFSC Climbing World Cup champion, beating Didier Raboutou at the final round in Lyon, with an audience of 8000 people (Jerry Moffatt finished 3rd). He also came first in that round of the World Cup winning £3000 for this. Nadin was nearly disqualified twice for late arrival due to not seeing instructions put up in the official hotel, as the UK team was staying in a youth hostel.

Later in 1989, he unsuccessfully attempted to free climb The Nose on El Capitan with Lynn Hill.

Nadin's training methods were unusual, training 'heavy' in the winter, but still able to complete difficult ascents having not climbed for a period of time.

Media
He appeared in series 3 of Coast climbing The Old Man of Hoy with Neil Oliver and Andy Cave.

Selected Climbs
Barriers in Time - The Roaches
Thing on a Spring - The Roaches
Paralogism - The Roaches
Painted Rumour - The Roaches
Dangerous Crocodile Snogging - Ramshaw Rocks, Staffordshire
Never Never Land - Ramshaw, Staffordshire
Master of Reality - Hen Cloud, Staffordshire
B4XS - Hen Cloud, Staffordshire
Inaccessible - Ina's Rock, Churnet Valley
Menopause - 6b (solo) - Stoney Middleton

See also
List of grade milestones in rock climbing
History of rock climbing
Rankings of most career IFSC gold medals

References

External links
 Simon Nadin on Flickr
 Simon Nadin, Climbing-History.org Page (January 2022) 

British rock climbers
1965 births
Living people
Sportspeople from Derbyshire
IFSC Climbing World Cup overall medalists